Barry Wagstaff (born 26 November 1945) is a former professional footballer with Sheffield United, Reading and Rotherham United.

Wagstaff was a defensive midfield player with Sheffield United from June 1963 until July 1969. He played for Reading until March 1975 when he joined Rotherham United, for whom he played until 1977.

References

External links 

1945 births
Living people
English footballers
Association football midfielders
Reading F.C. players
Rotherham United F.C. players
Sheffield United F.C. players
English Football League players